Bosco Marengo is a town and comune (municipality) in the Province of Alessandria in the Italian region Piedmont, located about  southeast of Turin and about  southeast of Alessandria.

Bosco Marengo borders the following municipalities: Alessandria, Basaluzzo, Casal Cermelli, Fresonara, Frugarolo, Novi Ligure, Pozzolo Formigaro, Predosa, and Tortona.

Nuclear enrichment plant 
There was a nuclear enrichment plant in Bosco Marengo, which started operating in 1973. The site was handed to SOGIN, the Italian nuclear decommissioning authority in 2005 and, in December 2008, it was decided that it should be decommissioned. The process was completed on 31 December 2021.

People
Pope Pius V (1504–1572)
Michele Bonelli (1541–1598), cardinal and papal diplomat.
Antonio Salvarezza (1902-1985), operatic tenor

References